Larry Beightol (born November 21, 1942) is a former American football coach. He has been inducted into both the Pennsylvania Sports Hall of Fame (Western Division) and the Catawba College Hall of Fame.

Early years
Beightol played high school football at West Branch High School and college football at Catawba College. He obtained his master's degree at The College of William & Mary

Career
Beightol's coaching career began in 1968 at the College of William and Mary, where he served as offensive line coach until 1971. From there, Beightol moved on to coach at North Carolina State, Auburn, the University of Arkansas, the University of Missouri, and Louisiana Tech University, where he spent the 1979 season as head football coach. In 1985, Beightol began his National Football League (NFL) coaching career, where he led the offensive lines for the Atlanta Falcons, Tampa Bay Buccaneers, San Diego Chargers, New York Jets, Houston Oilers, and Miami Dolphins before joining the Green Bay Packers as offensive line coach in 1999 under Head Coach Ray Rhodes. When Mike Sherman became the Packers coach in 2000, Beightol was one of the few assistant coaches he retained from the previous coaching regime.

In early 2006, Sherman was fired by the Packers after a disappointing 4-12 season. The new head coach, Mike McCarthy, released much of the coaching staff after he was hired, including Beightol. He was hired in late January 2006 by the Detroit Lions and new head coach Rod Marinelli to coach the Lions' offensive line. In January 2007 he was fired from the Detroit Lions.

Beightol stays involved in coaching nationally, as an offensive line coach preparing college stars for the NFL combine, at Competitive Edge Sports (CES) of Atlanta. Beightol also runs a national football camps for high school stars in training.

Head coaching record

References

Further reading

1942 births
Living people
American football linebackers
American football offensive guards
Atlanta Falcons coaches
Arkansas Razorbacks football coaches
Auburn Tigers football coaches
Catawba Indians football players
Detroit Lions coaches
Green Bay Packers coaches
Houston Oilers coaches
Louisiana Tech Bulldogs and Lady Techsters athletic directors
Louisiana Tech Bulldogs football coaches
Miami Dolphins coaches
Missouri Tigers football coaches
NC State Wolfpack football coaches
New York Jets coaches
San Diego Chargers coaches
Tampa Bay Buccaneers coaches
William & Mary Tribe football coaches
Coaches of American football from Pennsylvania
Players of American football from Pennsylvania